Gamecock Cottage is an historic building located at Stony Brook in Brookhaven Town, in Suffolk County, New York on Long Island.  It was built in 1876 for storage of oars and sliding-seat rowboats and is the only remaining wooden beach cottage that was part of West Meadow Beach.  It is located at the southernmost point of a peninsula within what is now part of the West Meadow Wetlands Reserve, as the official public beach is now restricted to the north.  The Gamecock Cottage sits at the southern endpoint of West Meadow Lane, which was once called Trustees Road.

It is a -story building with a front-gabled roof with a four-sided wooden cupola located in the center of the ridge line in the Gothic Revival style.  It is 20 feet, 5 inches wide and 25 feet, 5 inches long and covered with board and batten siding.

It was added to the National Register of Historic Places in 2007.

References

Houses on the National Register of Historic Places in New York (state)
Gothic Revival architecture in New York (state)
Houses in Suffolk County, New York
National Register of Historic Places in Suffolk County, New York